Tim Progosh (born December 21, 1957) is a Canadian actor and the creator and original producer of the Canadian Comedy Awards, an annual awards presentation that celebrates Canadian comedy in a variety of media (TV, radio, film, the Internet, etc.) inaugurated in 2000.

His most notable roles include Principal Bill Kremeza in the 2015 award-winning film Spotlight, which won the Academy Award for Best Picture with Best Original Screenplay at the 88th Academy Awards (2016), and the ensemble cast character Firouz in the TV series The Adventures of Sinbad (1996–1998).

Tim graduated with a Double Honors degree in Political Science and Drama from the University of Western Ontario. His first job was as a lobbyist for the Canadian Federal Government, but switched permanently to acting and stand-up comedy in 1981. He studied screenwriting at Algonquin College in Ottawa and improvisational acting at The Second City in Toronto.

Filmography

Films/TV Films
1990: Prom Night III: The Last Kiss (1990) as Other Reporter
1990: Christmas in America (TV Movie) as Young Kenny Rogers (age 22)
1991: Thick as Thieves as Yuppie
1992: To Catch a Killer (TV Movie) Delta Squad Detective Jack Morris
1993: Life with Mikey as Lawyer Norman Feller
1994: Back in Action as Kasajian's assistant
1994: The Babymaker: The Dr. Cecil Jacobson Story (TV Movie) as Mr. Black
1995: Net Worth (TV Movie) as Player #3
1996: The Abduction (TV Movie) as Robert
1996: Remembrance (TV Movie) as Clem Stafford
1997: Shadow Zone: My Teacher Ate My Homework as Jesse's Dad
1999: The Corruptor as Lackey
1999: A Touch of Hope (TV Movie) as Joshua Peterson
2000: A Tale of Two Bunnies (TV Movie) as Comedian
2000: The Sandy Bottom Orchestra (TV Movie) as Cecil Bateman
2001: Jet Jackson: The Movie (TV Movie) as Sylvester (uncredited)
2001: Who Is Cletis Tout? (2001) as Young Micah
2003: The Gospel of John as The Master of the Feast
2004: I Downloaded a Ghost (TV Movie) as Walter Blackstone
2004: The Good Shepherd as Phillip Patterson
2005: Confession of an American Bride (TV Movie) (uncredited)
2012: Channelled Lives (Short) as Warren
2015: Spotlight as Principal Bill Kemeza
2018: eHero as Scotty Malloy
2019: Goalie as J.E. Norris
2020: Love at Look Lodge as Russel

Television Series
1987: Degrassi Junior High (1987) as Policeman
1990-1991: Street Legal as Reporter Tim
1994: Robocop: The Series (1994) as Mark McAdam
1995: The X-Files as Mr. Fielding
1996-1998: The Adventures of Sinbad as Firouz
1998-2001: First Wave as Dean Hormeth
1999: The Outer Limits as Walter Black
1999: Cold Squad as Father Geddes
1999: Twice in a Lifetime as Gary Ray
2000: Relic Hunter as Angus MacEvoy
2000: Code Name: Eternity as Scientist Cross
2001: Super Rupert as Sheriff Dave Patterson
2001: Within These Walls as Emily's Father
2003: Doc as Art Lang
2004: 1-800-Missing as Dr. Benson
2011: Covert Affairs as Doctor
2013: Murdoch Mysteries (2013) Mr. Edgar Leeman

As Producer
2000: The 2000 Canadian Comedy Awards (TV Special) (producer)
2001: The 2nd Annual Canadian Comedy Awards (TV Special) (producer)
2002: The 3rd Annual Canadian Comedy Awards (Video) (producer)
2002: Sketch Troop (TV Series) (producer)
2003: The Road to Funny (TV Movie documentary) (executive producer) / (producer)
2003: The 4th Annual Canadian Comedy Awards (TV Special) (producer)
2004: The 5th Annual Canadian Comedy Awards (TV Special) (producer)
2005: The 6th Annual Canadian Comedy Awards (TV Special) (producer)
2006: The 7th Annual Canadian Comedy Awards (TV Special) (producer)
2007: The Naughty Show (TV Special) (executive producer)
2007: The Nice Show (TV Special) (executive producer)
2007: The 8th Annual Canadian Comedy Awards (TV Special) (producer)
2008: The Canadian Comedy Awards: Best of the Fest 2007 (TV Special) (producer)
2008: The 9th Annual Canadian Comedy Awards (TV Special) (producer)
2009: The 10th Annual Canadian Comedy Awards (TV Special) (executive producer) / (producer)
2010: The 11th Annual Canadian Comedy Awards (TV Special) (producer)
2011: The 12th Annual Canadian Comedy Awards (TV Special) (executive producer)
2012: The 13h Annual Canadian Comedy Awards (executive producer)
2013: The 14th Annual Canadian Comedy Awards (executive producer)
2014: The 15th Annual Canadian Comedy Awards (executive producer)
2015: The 16th Annual Canadian Comedy Awards (executive producer)

As Writer
2002: The 2nd Annual Canadian Comedy Awards (TV Special)
2006: George Canyon's Christmas (TV Special)
2009: The 10th Annual Canadian Comedy Awards (TV Special)

References

External links

1957 births
Canadian male television actors
Living people
Male actors from Ottawa